Eucereon discolor is a moth of the subfamily Arctiinae. It was described by Francis Walker in 1856. It is found in Panama, Bolivia and São Paulo, Brazil.

References

 

discolor
Moths described in 1856